All or Nothing is the name and format of a lottery game where the player chooses half of the numbers in play. Prizes are awarded based on how many of the numbers chosen match the numbers in the official draw. Because the player chooses half of the number matrix, the odds of selecting all numbers drawn and of selecting none of the numbers drawn are identical. Subsequently, identical top prizes are awarded for matching all numbers or nothing, hence the name. Smaller prizes are likewise symmetrical, with the second-prize tier being awarded for matching all but one number, or only one number, and so on. The concept originated in 2012 with the Texas Lottery, and has since been adopted by other states.

Lotteries with "All or Nothing" games
Multiple lotteries in the United States offer versions of the game:

The Illinois Lottery once offered Hit or Miss, a game played similarly, with the addition of "The Good Life" number that also was printed for each play. Matching all or none of the 12 out of 24 regular numbers drawn won $250,000 cash; also matching "The Good Life" number, from 1 to 6, won an additional $100,000 per year for 20 years. Drawings were held four times a day, and ran from September 22, 2013, to February 28, 2015.

Outside the US, this format was used by the National Lottery of Ireland between 2009 and 2012 and is used for the Russian state lottery game "All or Nothing", which has a guaranteed jackpot of 2,000,000 rubles and is drawn every 15 minutes per hour.

References

Lottery games in the United States